I barbieri di Sicilia ("The Barbers of Sicily") is a 1967 Italian war-comedy film written and directed by Marcello Ciorciolini starring the comic duo Franco and Ciccio.

Plot    
Franco Lo Persico is a barber for men, while his cousin Ciccio Lo Persico is a hairdresser for women. Both are in love with Rosina Giovinazzo, niece of the ugly aunt Donna Maruzza.

In the Sicilian village of Santa Rosalia, the Americans are about to land and the Germans send Colonel Otto von Kraus. He wants to make believe that he is there to rest with his wife, but instead is accompanied by two important chemists, Stulz and Ebner, to stop the landing of the Americans.

The Americans send an officer to the country to destroy the plans of the Germans. This in town is presented as Stefano Minasi, nephew of the priest Don Liborio. The village boss Don Calogero Milazzo makes him work in Ciccio's hairdressing shop as an assistant. Through a transmitter hidden in the parish confessional, Stefano lets the Americans know when the time is right to land in Sicily. When Franco and Ciccio arrive, for their skill, they receive a prize of 10 000 dollars, with which they will open a Coiffeur pour dames together with the barber, all in a single shop. Eventually Steve Minasi marries Rosalia, removing the beautiful Sicilian girl in front of Franco and Ciccio's eyes.

Cast 
Franco Franchi as Franco Lo Persico
Ciccio Ingrassia as  Ciccio Lo Persico
Daniela Giordano as  Rosina
Carlo Hintermann as  Colonel Von Krauss
Giorgia Moll as  Helga Von Krauss 
Mario Maranzana as  Don Calogero Milazzo
Jean Valmont as  Captain Steve Minasi
Enzo Andronico as  Podestà
Ignazio Spalla as  Turi the farmer
Adriana Facchetti as  Donna Maruzza 
Franco Pesce as Don Liborio

References

External links

1960s buddy comedy films
Italian World War II films
Italian buddy comedy films
Films directed by Marcello Ciorciolini
Films scored by Piero Umiliani
1967 comedy films
1967 films
1960s Italian films
Italian war comedy films